Keralida Simha is a 1981 Indian Kannada-language film directed by Chi Dattaraj. The film stars Rajkumar, Saritha, Thoogudeepa Srinivas, Pandari Bai and Srinivasa Murthy. The movie was produced by P. H. Ramarao in the banner of Sri Rajarajeshwari Film combines.
The movie was recorded a Blockbuster at the box office and had a theatrical run of over 100 days in multiple centres.

A day before the release, the prints of the movie got stuck in Chennai and the producer had no option other than scrapping the movie. However, Parvathamma Rajkumar stepped in at the end moment and arranged for personal transportation for the rolls to be distributed to the district centres in Karnataka and saw to that the movie released smoothly. This incident proved her mettle in the industry as a distributor and her ability to sail through the crisis.

Plot 

The film revolves around two brothers who are police officers. Rajkumar plays the role of elder brother of Shankar, who is a strict and honest police officer. The protagonist falls in love with a lawyer played by Saritha. The protagonist seizes a gang which involves in the consumption of illegal drugs. It is revealed that the leader of the gang is the son of a rich businessman played by Thoogudeepa Srinivas. Under difficult circumstances the lawyer played by Sarita becomes the defence lawyer for the accused.

Cast
Rajkumar
Saritha
Thoogudeepa Srinivas
Shakti Prasad
Srinivasa Murthy
Honnavalli Krishna
Sudheer
Pandari Bai

Soundtrack
Chellapilla Satyam composed the movie songs while Chi. Udayashankar worked as the lyricist.

Release 
The film received a U Certificate from the Chennai regional office of the censor board without any cuts.

Due to the prints being blocked in Chennai, there remained an uncertainty over the film's release. Eventually the film had a low profile release without much marketing irrespective of which the film turned out to be a Blockbuster completing over 17 weeks of theatrical run in 11 centres across  Karnataka.

Awards
 Filmfare Award for Best Actor (1981) – Rajkumar
 Karnataka State Film Award for Best Sound Recording (1981) – Seetharam

References

External Source
 

1981 films
1980s Kannada-language films
Films scored by Satyam (composer)
Films directed by Chi. Dattaraj